Carbide bromides are mixed anion compounds containing bromide and carbide anions.
Many carbide bromides are cluster compounds, containing on, two or more carbon atoms in a core, surrounded by a layer of metal atoms, encased in a shell of bromide ions. These ions may be shared between clusters to form chains, double chains or layers.

The great majority of these carbide bromide compounds contain rare earth elements. Since these elements have similar properties, similar structures can be made by substituting the elements.  R2CBr2 forms a structure with layers of R6C clusters that contain one carbon atom. Each layer has bromide coating the top and bottom. Very similar is R2CBr2 which has layers of R6C2 clusters containing pairs of carbon atoms. This dicarbon is an ethenide (C24−), and contains a double bond. Layers have bromide on both sides, and so they are only weakly held together by van der Waals forces. If these layers are aligned with each other a 1T- form results with a small c measurement on the unit cell. In some compounds the layers are not quite aligned, but repeat after three layers giving a 3R form, with a larger c unit cell height. Where the layers align, the crystal system is trigonal. But if the layers never quite align at any height, a monoclinic crystal results. The C2 unit sits at an angle to the layers, and thus reduces symmetry compared to compounds with single carbon atoms in the cluster.

In R2CBr there are layers of R6C that share bromide between layers.

List

References 

Bromides
Carbides
Mixed anion compounds